Sisters in Law: Stories from a Cameroon Court (2005) is a feature-length documentary film by Florence Ayisi and Kim Longinotto portraying aspects of women's lives and work in the judicial system in Cameroon, West Africa.

Plot
The film centres around four cases in Cameroon involving violence against women. It shows women seeking justice and effecting change on universal human interests issues.  It also shows strong and positive images of women and children, and their lives as they live by the Islamic law (Sharia law). In addition, the cases that are examined within the film particularly deal mainly with the inequality of women and children.  Specifically, one of the children was beaten with a cane and the aunt was charged with child abuse.

Reception

Sisters In Law has been screened in over 120 film festivals around the world, and also in Art House cinemas in Europe and USA. In the US, it aired on the PBS series Independent Lens. It has won many film awards including the prestigious Prix Art et Essai at the Cannes Film Festival in May 2005, Best Documentary Film at Hawaii International Film Festival, Audience Award at International Documentary Film Festival Amsterdam (IDFA), Best Documentary on a Contemporary issue, Grierson Award, Social Justice Award for Documentary Film at Santa Barbara International Film Festival, Best International Documentary at Real Life on Film Festival, Melbourne and Best Single Documentary, Royal Television Society. In 2007, Sisters In Law won a Peabody Award.

Critical response
Review aggregator Rotten Tomatoes reports that 92% of 26 critic reviews were positive, with an average rating of 7.1/10. The website's critics consensus reads, "Enlightening, uplifting, and compelling, Sisters in Law takes an unflinching -- and often humorous -- look at efforts to effect legal progress for Muslim women in Cameroon."

References

External links 

 
 Sisters in Law at Women Make Movies

2005 films
Documentary films about violence against women
Documentary films about law
Law of Cameroon
Cameroonian women
Films directed by Kim Longinotto
Films about domestic violence
Peabody Award-winning broadcasts
Documentary films about women in Africa
2005 documentary films